Yeh Kya Ho Raha Hai (What Is Happening?) is a 2002 Bollywood adult comedy film. Directed by Hansal Mehta, produced by Pammi Baweja and written by Suparn Verma. It stars Prashant Chianani, Aamir Ali Malik, Vaibhav Jalani, Yash Pandit, Deepti Daryanani, Payal Rohatgi, Samita Bangargi and Punarnava Mehta. Its basic premise is taken from the American film American Pie.

Plot
Four young men join a college and develop a friendship with each other. The four also meet various young ladies and romance them throughout their semester. The question remains that will they be able to follow through with love lives after this term and will they also get passing grades at the same time?

Cast
Prashant Chianani as Ranjeet
Aamir Ali Malik as Rahul 
Vaibhav Jalani as Bunty 
Yash Pandit as Johnny 
Deepti Daryanani as Preeti
Payal Rohatgi as Esha 
Gajraj Rao as Bunty's father
Samita Bangargi as Anu 
Punarnava Mehta as Stella
Mumaith Khan (Cameo)

Soundtracks

The movie soundtrack has 6 songs composed by Shankar–Ehsaan–Loy, with lyrics by Javed Akhtar.

References

2000s Hindi-language films
Indian sex comedy films
2002 films
2000s sex comedy films
Films scored by Shankar–Ehsaan–Loy
Indian remakes of American films
2002 comedy films